Palframan is a surname. Notable people with the surname include:

 Justine Palframan (born 1993), South African sprinter
 Richard Palframan (born 1993), South African rugby union player
 Steve Palframan (born 1970), South African cricketer